Luxinnovation is the Luxembourg national innovation agency. It offers services to companies and public research actors in order to foster innovation, thus supporting the Government's economic development objectives.
 
The agency also ensures that Luxembourg continues to attract international investment, companies and skills.

History 
Founded in 1984, Luxinnovation is an Economic Interest Grouping (EIG) that, since 1998, has combined the efforts of:
 the Ministry of the Economy
 the Ministry for Higher Education and Research
 the Luxembourg Chamber of Commerce
 the Chambre des Métiers
 Fedil

Startup support 
In an effort to foster the local entrepreneurial ecosystem in the technological field, in 2015 Luxinnovation launched its first startup accelerator Fit for Start, that now offers a grant of €150,000 equity free to selected projects operating in the ICT.

Company relations and support / Cluster initiative 
Through the services it offers, the agency helps companies to develop and to remain competitive through innovation.

Funding support 
Expert advisors provide guidance to companies with regard to national and European research and development funding opportunities that best suit their RDI strategy. Luxinnovation advises on the most appropriate instruments and programmes and supports companies preparing funding applications.

Company performance programmes 
Luxinnovation offers different types of programmes to encourage and support companies to innovate and grow taking into account their specific needs: 
- Fit 4 Digital – Supports the digitalisation of SMEs.
- Fit 4 Innovation – Improves the competitiveness of SMEs by strengthening their organisational performance.
- Fit 4 Sustainability – helps companies assess and reduce their environmental impact in order to decrease costs, improve their reputation and gain new clients who value a sustainable approach.

References

European trade associations
Science and technology in Luxembourg
Government agencies of Luxembourg
Space agencies
Innovation organizations